Beatopia is the second studio album by Filipino-British singer and songwriter Beabadoobee. It was released on British independent label Dirty Hit on 15 July 2022. It features collaborations with singer PinkPantheress, Matty Healy and George Daniel of the 1975, Cavetown, and Jack Steadman of Bombay Bicycle Club.

Critical reception

At Metacritic, which assigns a normalised rating out of 100 to reviews from mainstream critics, the album has an average score of 78, based on 16 reviews, indicating "generally favorable reviews". In a three-star review, Rachel Aroesti of The Guardian said that Beatopias "crowd-pleasing combination of poppy euphoria, laidback cool and often rather generic lyrics tends not to leave a lasting impression of much beyond stylishly executed nostalgia". Arielle Gordon of Pitchfork criticised the lyrical content of the album as being "often more form than function", though in a mixed review for PopMatters Jay Honeycomb noted that the lyrics deal with the challenges of human intimacy.  In a more positive review, Kerrang! characterised Beatopia as a progression from Beabadoobee's debut album with "more diversity, more complexity and less care paid to the genres it falls within", marking an artistic evolution. Similarly, Hollie Geraghty writing for NME sees "the seeds that were planted in Fake It Flowers not only blossom, but inhabit an entirely different world" with Beatopia. In a mixed review for The Telegraph, Kate French-Morris wrote, "Kristi's music may sound fresh to the ears of those born this side of the millennium, but it's rehashed, scrubbed-up, 1990s alt-rock to everyone else, so well-cribbed she sounds like a fictional artist dreamed up to soundtrack a teen movie." Writing for The Line of Best Fit, John Amen scored the project 8/10 and commented, "If Fake Flowers featured Laus toeing the indie line, at times self-deprecatingly, Beatopia is her unapologetic leap into mega viability."

Track listing 

Notes
 Song names styling:
 "The Perfect Pair", "Broken CD", "Fairy Song", and "Tinkerbell Is Overrated" are stylised in all lowercase.
 "Sunny Day", "Don't Get the Deal", and "You're Here That's the Thing" are stylized in sentence case.
 "See You Soon" is stylised as "See you Soon"

Personnel

Musicians 

 Beabadoobee – vocals, electric guitar, acoustic guitar, percussion
 Jacob Bugden – guitar, programming, synthesizers, keyboards, bass, backing vocals, percussion, flute, drums, organ, mandolin, piano, string arrangements
 Eliana Sewell – bass, percussion, backing vocals
 Luca Caruso – drums, percussion
 Jim Reed – drums, percussion
 Iain Berryman – programming, synthesizers, percussion, Wurlitzer, guitar, bass, piano, gomet, organ, glockenspiel
 Matty Healy – vocals, guitar
 Jack Steadman – guitar, bass, programming
 Finlay Dow-Smith – drum programming, bass synthesizer
 PinkPantheress – vocals
 Robin Skinner – backing vocals
 George Daniel – synthesizers, programming
 Georgia Ellery – strings, string arrangements
 Gareth Lockrane – flute
 Drew Dungrate-Smith – claps
 Andrea Cozzaglio – metal shutter
 Ben Baptie – programming
 Molly Hayward – percussion, backing vocals
 Soren Harrison – percussion, backing vocals, claps
 Amir Hossain – claps
 Calum Harrison – percussion, backing vocals

Technical 
 Ben Baptie – mixing
 Joe LaPorta – mastering
 Jacob Bugden – engineering
 Iain Berryman – engineering
 Drew Dungrate-Smith – engineering
 Sophie Ellis – mixing assistance
 Claude Vause – additional engineering
 Andrea Cozzaglio – additional engineering
 Jonathan Gilmore – additional engineering (tracks 4, 9, 14)
 Joseph Bodgers – additional engineering (track 12)

Charts

References

2022 albums
Beabadoobee albums
Dirty Hit albums